Eugene A. Toepel (July 29, 1916 – July 27, 2006) was an American legislator and jurist from Wisconsin.

Born in Bangor, Wisconsin, Toepel graduated from the University of Wisconsin Law School in 1939. He served in the United States Army in Europe during World War II from 1942 to 1946, then served in the Wisconsin State Assembly from 1953 until 1957 as a Republican. In 1957, Toepel resigned from the Wisconsin State Assembly, when the Governor of Wisconsin Vernon Wallace Thomson appointed Toepel county judge (later Wisconsin Circuit Court judge) in La Crosse County, Wisconsin to fill a vacancy. Toepel served for 25 years until retiring. He died in De Pere, Wisconsin two days before his 90th birthday.

Notes

People from Bangor, Wisconsin
Military personnel from Wisconsin
University of Wisconsin Law School alumni
Republican Party members of the Wisconsin State Assembly
Wisconsin state court judges
1916 births
2006 deaths
20th-century American judges
20th-century American politicians